Nicholas John Robinson (born March 22, 1995) is an American actor. As a child, he appeared in a 2008 stage production of A Christmas Carol and Mame, after which he starred in the television sitcom Melissa & Joey (2010–2015). He went on to play a supporting role in the adventure film Jurassic World (2015) and took on lead roles in several teen dramas, including The Kings of Summer (2013), The 5th Wave (2016), Everything, Everything (2017), and Love, Simon (2018). He has since starred in the miniseries A Teacher (2020) and Maid (2021).

In 2018, Robinson was named in Forbes "30 Under 30" list in the Hollywood & Entertainment category.

Early life
Robinson was born on March 22, 1995, in Seattle, Washington. He has four younger siblings. His mother is Denise Podnar. Robinson initially attended Seattle Preparatory School, but left in the middle of his freshman year and moved to Los Angeles after booking a regular role on Melissa & Joey. He graduated from Campbell Hall School in 2013. He was accepted to New York University’s College of Arts and Sciences and attended in the summer to work on another season of Melissa & Joey.

Career
Robinson made his professional acting debut at the age of eleven with a role in a stage adaptation of Charles Dickens' novel A Christmas Carol. Talent scout Matt Casella recommended him to a few agencies and Robinson was eventually signed with the Los Angeles-based Savage Agency. Because of the 2007–2008 Writers Guild of America strike, Robinson's family moved back to Washington where he continued to perform on stage in and around Seattle.

In 2010, Robinson was cast in the role of Ryder Scanlon, the nephew of Melissa Joan Hart's character, on the ABC Family sitcom Melissa & Joey, playing the character until its cancellation in 2015.

In 2011, while on hiatus from Melissa & Joey, Robinson began filming of the Disney Channel original movie Frenemies; Robinson played the role of Jake Logan. Frenemies premiered in January 2012, on the Disney Channel.

In 2012, Robinson was cast in the lead role of Joe Toy in director Jordan Vogt-Roberts' The Kings of Summer. He also guest-starred in the episode "Blue Bell Boy," during the third season of HBO's Boardwalk Empire. He also began appearing in a series of television commercials for Cox Communications entitled "Buffer Time is Bonding Time."

In 2015, Robinson portrayed Zach Mitchell in Jurassic World, in which he was widely seen. He played Ben Parish in the film adaptation of the novel The 5th Wave, which was released in January 2016. These roles made him unavailable for multiple episodes of the final season of Melissa & Joey, but he returned for the final three episodes.

He played the titular lead in independent film Being Charlie, a semi-autobiographical feature about director Rob Reiner's relationship with his son, which premiered at the 2015 Toronto International Film Festival; the film was released theatrically in 2016.

In 2017, he starred in William H. Macy's comedy-drama film Krystal, and as Olly in Everything, Everything, a film adaptation of the novel of the same name.

In 2018, Robinson starred as the titular Simon Spier in the gay coming out teen drama film Love, Simon. The film was considered ground-breaking because it was the first major studio film to focus on a gay, teenage romance. Robinson's performance as Simon garnered critical acclaim. After reading the script, Robinson revealed that he broke his own rule to no longer play high schoolers because he saw the cultural importance of the film. In 2019, he co-starred in the third film version of Richard Wright's Native Son.

In 2020, Robinson co-starred in the FX miniseries A Teacher, and he narrated his DM responses to the protagonist of Love, Victor, a Love, Simon spinoff TV series on Hulu, and appeared in two episodes of the show. In 2021, he starred in the Netflix miniseries Maid, opposite Margaret Qualley and Andie MacDowell. The series was critically acclaimed, with Robinson receiving praise for his performance.

Filmography

Film

Television

Video games

Theatre

Awards and nominations

References

External links

 

1995 births
Living people
21st-century American male actors
American male child actors
American male film actors
American male stage actors
American male television actors
Male actors from Seattle
New York University Gallatin School of Individualized Study alumni